Bernardino Buratti or  Buratto (1574–1628) was a Roman Catholic prelate who served as Archbishop of Manfredonia (1623–1628) and Bishop of Vulturara e Montecorvino (1615–1623).

Biography
Bernardino Buratti was born in 1574 in Rome, Italy.
On 12 Jan 1615, he was appointed during the papacy of Pope Paul V as Bishop of Vulturara e Montecorvino.
On 5 Apr 1615, he was consecrated bishop by Metello Bichi, Cardinal-Priest of Sant'Alessio, with Ulpiano Volpi, Archbishop of Chieti, and Leonardo Roselli, Bishop Emeritus of Vulturara e Montecorvino, serving as co-consecrators. 
On 9 Jan 1623, he was appointed during the papacy of Pope Gregory XV as Archbishop of Manfredonia.
He served as Archbishop of Manfredonia until his death on 11 Apr 1628.

While bishop, he was the principal co-consecrator of Dionisio Martini, Bishop of Nepi e Sutri (1616).

References

External links and additional sources
 (for Chronology of Bishops) 
 (for Chronology of Bishops) 
 (for Chronology of Bishops) 
 (for Chronology of Bishops)  

17th-century Italian Roman Catholic archbishops
Bishops appointed by Pope Paul V
Bishops appointed by Pope Gregory XV
1574 births
1628 deaths
Clergy from Rome